is a kind of Japanese ekiben boxed meal sold on trains and train stations in Japan. It is a type of oshizushi (pressed sushi) and a well-known souvenir of Toyama.

Masuzushi is made of vinegared trout sashimi on top of vinegared rice and wrapped in bamboo leaves.

See also
 Japanese regional cuisine

References

External links

 富山ます寿し協同組合  - Toyama Masuzuishi Cooperative

Bento
Japanese cuisine
Railway culture in Japan
Sushi